Acleris lutescentis is a species of moth of the family Tortricidae. It is found in China (Hubei).

References

Moths described in 1987
lutescentis
Moths of Asia